The Drake Hotel, a historic 375-foot-tall, 33-story luxury hotel located at 1512–1514 Spruce Street at the corner of S. Hicks Street between S. 15th and S. 16th Streets in the Rittenhouse Square neighborhood of Philadelphia, Pennsylvania was built in 1928–29 by the Murphy, Quigley Company and was designed by the architectural firm of Ritter and Shay in the Art Deco style with Spanish Baroque terra cotta ornamentation on themes surrounding Sir Francis Drake, including "dolphins, shells, sailing vessels and globes."  The building is topped by a terra cotta dome.

The building was listed on the National Register of Historic Places on September 18, 1978. It was added to the Philadelphia Register of Historic Places on October 6, 1977. In 1998, the building was extensively renovated and converted to condominiums as "The Drake".

See also

National Register of Historic Places listings in Center City, Philadelphia

References
Notes

External links

Listing at emporis.com
Listing and photographs at Philadelphia Architects and Buildings

Hotel buildings completed in 1928
Hotel buildings on the National Register of Historic Places in Pennsylvania
Philadelphia Register of Historic Places
Residential buildings in Philadelphia
Rittenhouse Square, Philadelphia
1928 establishments in Pennsylvania
National Register of Historic Places in Philadelphia